Ljupka Arsova - Džundeva (11 July 1934 – 7 December 2018) was Macedonian film and theater actress.

Biography 
Džundeva was born in Skopje, Macedonia.  She graduated from State Theatre School and became a member of the Macedonian National Theatre in 1951, where she worked until her retirement in 1990. She successfully implemented monodrama too. She was awarded the "13th of November" award of the City of Skopje in 1983 in the field of culture and art, then the award for artistic accomplishment conferred by the Yugoslav Radio Television, the "Decoration of Labour with Silver Wreath".

Filmography

1961: A Quiet Summer (Main role)
1967: Macedonian Bloody Wedding (Supporting role)
1980: The Lead Brigade (Supporting role)
1997: Gypsy Magic (Supporting role)
1999: Life, Time (Main role)

References

External links
Džundeva at Macedonian Cinema Information Center

1934 births
2018 deaths
Actresses from Skopje
Macedonian stage actresses
Macedonian film actresses
20th-century actresses